Lóránt Hegedüs (28 June 1872 – 1 January 1943) was a Hungarian politician, who served as Minister of Finance between 1920 and 1921. He finished his studies in Berlin and London. After that he started his career in the Ministry of Finance, then he worked in the United States when he researched the emigration cases. Hegedüs served as chairman of the Hungarian Trade Bank. Pál Teleki appointed him Minister of Finance, Hegedüs kept his position in the István Bethlen cabinet. From 1920 he was member of the Hungarian Academy of Sciences and the Kisfaludy Society. He took a part in the literary fights of his age, opposite the conservative forces' attacks he protected Endre Ady. Hegedüs had works dealing with economic, taxation and emigration questions reported.

References

 Magyar Életrajzi Lexikon

1872 births
1943 deaths
Politicians from Budapest
Finance ministers of Hungary
Members of the Hungarian Academy of Sciences
Hungarian economists